The women's team time trial of the 1987 UCI Road World Championships cycling event took place on 1 September 1987 in Villach, Austria.

Final classification

Source

References

UCI Road World Championships – Women's team time trial
1987 UCI Road World Championships
UCI